Donghe Township is a township in Lancang Lahu Autonomous County, Yunnan, China.

Etymology
The name of "Donghe" named is after the "Dong River", which flows through the region.

Administrative division
As of 2016, the township is divided into seven villages: 
Banggna 
Hebian 
Dalaba 
Nandai 
Donghe 
Zhabu 
Xiaotang

History
In the Republic of China (1912-1949), it belonged to Daling Township.

After establishment of the Communist State, it was merged into Dashan District. It was demerged from Donghe District in 1984. It was incorporated officially as a township in 1988.

Geography
It lies at the northern of Lancang Lahu Autonomous County, bordering Nanling Township to the southwest, Fubang Township to the west, ianliu Yi Ethnic Township to the south and east, Shangyun to the northwest, and Dashan Township to the northeast.

The Dong River and Laba River flow through the township.

Economy
The principal industries in the area are agriculture. Significant crops include grain, corn, wheat, tea, and fruit.

Demographics

As of 2017, the National Bureau of Statistics of China estimates the township's population now to be 11,115.

References

Bibliography

Townships of Pu'er City
Divisions of Lancang Lahu Autonomous County